Ramsay is a lunar impact crater that is located on the Moon's far side. It lies to the south-southwest of the larger crater Jules Verne, and is nearly in contact with the satellite crater Jules Verne P along the northern outer rim. To the southeast of Ramsay is the crater Koch, and to the west-southwest lies the overlapping pair of Roche and Pauli.

This is a worn crater, although the rim retains a generally circular character and is marked only by tiny craterlets (except for a notch in the south-southeast). The interior floor is relatively featureless, with a low central rise near the midpoint.

Satellite craters
By convention these features are identified on lunar maps by placing the letter on the side of the crater midpoint that is closest to Ramsay.

References

 
 
 
 
 
 
 
 
 
 
 
 

Impact craters on the Moon